The discography of Canadian heavy metal singer Sebastian Bach consists of three studio albums, one live album, one compilation album, one EP, eight singles, and various videos. This list include all solo material or side projects performed by Bach.

Solo discography

Studio albums

Extended plays

Live albums

Compilation albums

Singles

Videography

Video albums

Music videos

Other appearances 
Trouble Walkin' – Ace Frehley, backing vocals on "Back to School" (1989)
Dr. Feelgood – Mötley Crüe, backing vocals on "Time for Change" (1989)
Believe in Me – Duff McKagan, vocals on "Trouble" (1993)
Acid Eaters – Ramones, backing vocals on "Out of Time" (1993)
Working Man - A Tribute to Rush, lead vocals on "Working Man" & "Jacob's Ladder" (1995)
Spacewalk: A Salute to Ace Frehley, lead vocals on "Rock Bottom" (1996)
Thunderbolt: A Tribute to AC/DC, lead vocals on "Little Lover" & "TNT" (1998)
Slave to the Power: The Iron Maiden Tribute, lead vocals on "Children of the Damned" (2000)
Randy Rhoads Tribute - A Tribute to Randy Rhoads, lead vocals on "Believer", "Crazy Train" & "I Don't Know" (2000)
Twisted Forever – A Tribute to Twisted Sister, lead vocals on "You Can't Stop Rock 'N Roll" (2001)
Sophie – BulletBoys, backing vocals on "Neighborhood" (2003)
Soundtrack of a Soul – Liberty N' Justice, lead vocals on "Another Nail" (2006)
Trailer Park Boys – Season 7 (2007)
4-All:The Best of LNJ – Liberty N' Justice, lead vocals on "Another Nail" (2008)
Chinese Democracy – Guns N' Roses, backing vocals on "Sorry" (2008)
Heavy Hitters – Michael Schenker Group, lead vocals on "I Don't Live Today" (2008)
Siam Shade Tribute, lead vocals on "Don't Tell Lies" (2010)
Todos Os Meus Passos – Kiara Rocks, backing vocals on "Careless Whisper" (2012)
Slave to the Empire – T&N, lead vocals on "Alone Again" (2012)
Born to Rage non-album single - Dada Life, lead vocals (2013)
Randy Rhoads Remembered Volume 1 lead vocals on "SATO" (2015)

With Kid Wikkid
1985 Kid Wikkid / "Maple Metal" / LP & cassette / Attic Records / "Take a Look at Me" / Canada

With Skid Row
Basement Tapes (rare demo) (1988)
Skid Row (1989)
Slave to the Grind (1991)
B-Side Ourselves (EP) (1992)
Subhuman Race (1995)
40 Seasons: The Best of Skid Row (1998)

Live
Subhuman Beings on Tour (EP) (1995)

Videos
Oh Say Can You Scream (1991)
No Frills Video (1993)
Road Kill (1993)

With The Last Hard Men
The Last Hard Men (1998, re-released in 2001)

With Frameshift
An Absence of Empathy (2005)

References 

Discography
Discographies of American artists
Rock music group discographies